Millvale is a borough in Allegheny County, Pennsylvania, United States, along the Allegheny River, opposite Pittsburgh. The borough is located off Pennsylvania Route 28. The population was 3,376 at the 2020 census.

Geography
Millvale is located at  (40.482968, -79.973725).

Millvale is located at the confluence of Girtys Run and the Allegheny River.  Much of the borough is on a floodplain and has been subjected to extensive flooding at many times during its history.

History
Millvale was formed around iron manufacturers, saw works, stone works, lumber mills, breweries, near the mouth of Girtys Run. In 1849, Herrs Island and the adjacent riverfront land of Reserve Township spanning from its northeastern boundary near Girtys Run downriver to Butcher's Run, the then-northeastern border of Allegheny City, were incorporated as the Borough of Duquesne (distinct from the modern borough of the same name). This Duquesne borough was disincorporated in 1868 and partitioned, the downriver portion being annexed to Allegheny City, while that part upriver of the northern end of Herrs Island was joined with adjacent lands to the north and east taken from Shaler Township to form the borough of Millvale.

Until 1952, the borough was served by the "3 Millvale" trolley operated by Pittsburgh Railways.

Surrounding communities
Millvale has three land borders with Shaler Township from the northwest to east, the Pittsburgh neighborhood of Troy Hill to the southwest, and Reserve Township to the west.  Across the Allegheny River, Millvale runs adjacent with Lower Lawrenceville and Central Lawrenceville. Millvale regularly collaborates with its northern riverside neighbors of Etna and Sharpsburg.

Demographics

As of the census of 2000, there were 4,028 people, 1,839 households, and 959 families residing in the borough. The population density was 6,187.1 people per square mile (2,392.6/km2). There were 2,085 housing units at an average density of 3,202.6 per square mile (1,238.5/km2). The racial makeup of the borough was 97.00% White, 0.97% African American, 0.20% Native American, 0.17% Asian, 0.67% from other races, and 0.99% from two or more races. Hispanic or Latino of any race were 0.89% of the population.

There were 1,839 households, out of which 26.8% had children under the age of 18 living with them, 32.6% were married couples living together, 14.4% had a female householder with no husband present, and 47.8% were non-families. 41.6% of all households were made up of individuals, and 14.4% had someone living alone who was 65 years of age or older. The average household size was 2.16 and the average family size was 2.96.

In the borough, the population was spread out, with 23.5% under the age of 18, 9.9% from 18 to 24, 32.4% from 25 to 44, 19.7% from 45 to 64, and 14.5% who were 65 years of age or older. The median age was 36 years. For every 100 females, there were 95.6 males. For every 100 females age 18 and over, there were 93.6 males.

The median income for a household in the borough was $26,509, and the median income for a family was $30,478. Males had a median income of $27,624 versus $22,278 for females. The per capita income for the borough was $14,526. About 11.2% of families and 13.2% of the population were below the poverty line, including 15.3% of those under age 18 and 5.7% of those age 65 or over.

Culture

St. Nicholas Roman Catholic Church, on Maryland Avenue in Millvale, was the first Croatian parish in America. Painted on the walls of the church are the world-renowned murals of Croatian artist Maksimilijan Vanka. These murals, painted in the 1930s and 1940s, were Vanka's gift to the United States.

Today, Millvale is home to a thriving bar and music scene. One of Pittsburgh's most popular live music venues, Mr. Smalls Theatre, regularly hosts international musical acts of various genres. There are also a number of craft breweries and locally owned bars in the area.

Government and politics

Recreation
Millvale Riverfront Park provides a 1.7 mile bike and walking trail that provides access from Millvale to Pittsburgh's North Shore, PNC Park, and Heinz Field along the Three Rivers Heritage Trail. The trail meanders along the Allegheny River, past Herrs Island, the TRRA Millvale Boathouse, and into the Millvale Riverfront Park. Plans for a bike/pedestrian bridge from the Millvale riverfront to Herrs Island has received partial funding from the DCNR and plans to connect the Millvale Trail to points north are being discussed. Access to the Millvale business district is less than half a mile away and restrooms are available. Other park amenities include a beautiful pavilion with riverfront access and a full kitchen, Mr. Smalls Skate Park, bike and boat rental, Millvale Marina, kayak and rowing boat launch access, fishing, a tackle and bait shop, and more. The Riverfront Park is also home to the wildly popular annual BrewFest in August and the newly launched, well-crafted Harvest Moon Wine Festival in the Fall.

Most recently, the Millvale Community Library has been launched as an all-volunteer effort of community members to take several vacant buildings and lots and turn them into a multi-use space centered on creating Millvale's first public library and associated garden space. This project was launched by community volunteers and Pittsburgh-based non-profit organization, New Sun Rising, in 2007 and has enlisted hundreds of volunteers to help turn this community dream into a reality.

References

External links
 Borough of Millvale official website
 Millvale Community Library

Populated places established in 1789
Pittsburgh metropolitan area
Boroughs in Allegheny County, Pennsylvania
1789 establishments in Pennsylvania